The South West Combination Women's Football League, also known simply as the South West Combination, was a women's football league in England from 1998 to 2014. Until the creation of the FA Women's Super League in 2011, they sat at the third level of English women's football pyramid along with the three other Combination Leagues – South East, Midland and Northern. The South West Combination fed into the FA Women's Premier League Southern Division, and lied above the Southern Region Women's Football League and the South West Regional Women's Football League in the pyramid. For the 2014–15 season the South West Combination was incorporated into the newly re-structured FA Women's Premier League as the FA WPL South West Division One.

Clubs for 2013–14 season

Previous champions

References

External links
Official website

Sports leagues established in 1998
4